James Boyd House, also known as Weymouth, is a historic home located at Southern Pines, Moore County, North Carolina. It was designed by architect Aymar Embury II and built in the 1920s.  It is a large, rambling Colonial Revival style brick dwelling.  It consists of a five-bay, two-story central block flanked by two-story hyphens and wings.  It was built by historical novelist James Boyd after World War I.  Since 1979, the building has housed the Weymouth Center for the Arts and Humanities.

It was added to the National Register of Historic Places in 1977.

References

Houses on the National Register of Historic Places in North Carolina
Colonial Revival architecture in North Carolina
Houses completed in 1920
Houses in Moore County, North Carolina
National Register of Historic Places in Moore County, North Carolina